Lingyin may refer to:

Lingyin Temple,  Buddhist temple in Hangzhou, Zhejiang, China
Prime minister (Chu State), or lingyin, prime minister or chancellor of ancient Chinese state of Chu